Hall Park Ground in Horsforth, near Leeds, Yorkshire, England is a cricket ground. The ground was the location of a first-class cricket match in August 1885 which pitted Yorkshire CCC against MB Hawke's XI.

The match was won by MB Hawke's XI by 3 wickets thanks to Australian Claude Rock who took 8 for 36 in Yorkshire's second innings.

Currently the Horsforth Hall Park Cricket Club play at this ground in the Airedale-Wharfedale Senior Cricket League.

References

External links
Hall Park Ground on CricketArchive

Cricket grounds in West Yorkshire
Sports venues completed in 1885
Horsforth